|}

The Michael Purcell Memorial Novice Hurdle is a Grade 3 National Hunt hurdle horse race in Ireland. It is run at Thurles Racecourse in February or March, over a distance of 2 miles and 4 furlongs (4,023 metres) and during the race there are twelve hurdles to be jumped. 

The race was first run in 2004. It was previously contested at Grade 2 level before being downgraded to Grade 3 in 2017.

Records
Most successful jockey (4 wins):
 Ruby Walsh – Kim Fontaine (2004), Cooldine (2008), Acapella Bourgeois (2016), Tin Soldier (2017)

Most successful trainer (4 wins): 
 Willie Mullins – Kim Fontaine (2004), Cooldine (2008), Tin Soldier (2017), Five O'Clock (2020) 
 Gordon Elliott -  Blow By Blow (2018), Grand Paradis (2021), The Goffer (2022), Sa Fureur (2023)

Winners

See also
Horse racing in Ireland
 List of Irish National Hunt races

References

Racing Post:

National Hunt races in Ireland
National Hunt hurdle races
Thurles Racecourse
2004 establishments in Ireland
Recurring sporting events established in 2004